The following is a partial list of the "C" codes for Medical Subject Headings (MeSH), as defined by the United States National Library of Medicine (NLM).

This list continues the information at List of MeSH codes (C04). Codes following these are found at List of MeSH codes (C06). For other MeSH codes, see List of MeSH codes.

The source for this content is the set of 2006 MeSH Trees from the NLM.

– musculoskeletal diseases

– bone diseases

– bone cysts
  – bone cysts, aneurysmal

– bone diseases, developmental
  – acro-osteolysis
  – Hajdu–Cheney syndrome
  – basal-cell nevus syndrome
  – dwarfism
  – achondroplasia
  – cockayne syndrome
  – congenital hypothyroidism
  – dwarfism, pituitary
  – Laron syndrome
  – Mulibrey nanism
  – thanatophoric dysplasia
  – dysostoses
  – craniofacial dysostosis
  – Hallermann's syndrome
  – hypertelorism
  – mandibulofacial dysostosis
  – goldenhar syndrome
  – focal dermal hypoplasia
  – Klippel–Feil syndrome
  – orofaciodigital syndromes
  – Rubinstein–Taybi syndrome
  – synostosis
  – craniosynostoses
  – acrocephalosyndactylia
  – syndactyly
  – acrocephalosyndactylia
  – Poland syndrome
  – funnel chest
  – gigantism
  – leg length inequality
  – Marfan syndrome
  – osteochondrodysplasias
  – achondroplasia
  – chondrodysplasia punctata
  – chondrodysplasia punctata, rhizomelic
  – cleidocranial dysplasia
  – diaphyseal dysplasia, progressive
  – Ellis–van Creveld syndrome
  – enchondromatosis
  – fibrous dysplasia of bone
  – cherubism
  – fibrous dysplasia, monostotic
  – fibrous dysplasia, polyostotic
  – hyperostosis, cortical, congenital
  – hyperostosis frontalis interna
  – Langer–Giedion syndrome
  – osteochondroma
  – osteochondromatosis
  – exostoses, multiple hereditary
  – osteogenesis imperfecta
  – osteosclerosis
  – melorheostosis
  – osteopetrosis
  – osteopoikilosis
  – acquired hyperostosis syndrome
  – short rib–polydactyly syndrome
  – thanatophoric dysplasia
  – osteolysis, essential
  – platybasia
  – Proteus syndrome

– bone diseases, endocrine
  – acromegaly
  – congenital hypothyroidism
  – dwarfism, pituitary
  – gigantism
  – osteitis fibrosa cystica

– bone diseases, infectious
  – osteitis
  – osteomyelitis
  – periostitis
  – spondylitis
  – discitis
  – tuberculosis, osteoarticular
  – tuberculosis, spinal

– bone diseases, metabolic
  – bone demineralization, pathologic
  – decalcification, pathologic
  – mucolipidoses
  – osteomalacia
  – osteoporosis
  – osteoporosis, postmenopausal
  – pseudohypoparathyroidism
  – pseudopseudohypoparathyroidism
  – renal osteodystrophy
  – rickets

– bone malalignment

– bone neoplasms
  – adamantinoma
  – femoral neoplasms
  – skull neoplasms
  – jaw neoplasms
  – mandibular neoplasms
  – maxillary neoplasms
  – palatal neoplasms
  – nose neoplasms
  – orbital neoplasms
  – skull base neoplasms
  – spinal neoplasms

– bone resorption
  – ainhum
  – alveolar bone loss
  – osteolysis
  – acro-osteolysis
  – Hajdu–Cheney syndrome
  – osteolysis, essential

– eosinophilic granuloma

– epiphyses, slipped

– hyperostosis
  – exostoses
  – exostoses, multiple hereditary
  – heel spur
  – hyperostosis, cortical, congenital
  – hyperostosis, diffuse idiopathic skeletal
  – hyperostosis frontalis interna
  – hyperostosis, sternocostoclavicular

– osteitis

– osteitis deformans

– osteoarthropathy, primary hypertrophic

– osteoarthropathy, secondary hypertrophic

– osteochondritis
  – osteochondritis dissecans
  – scheuermann's disease

– osteonecrosis
  – femur head necrosis
  – Legg–Perthes disease

– spinal diseases
  – intervertebral disc displacement
  – ossification of posterior longitudinal ligament
  – platybasia
  – scheuermann's disease
  – spinal curvatures
  – kyphosis
  – lordosis
  – scoliosis
  – spinal neoplasms
  – spinal osteophytosis
  – hyperostosis, diffuse idiopathic skeletal
  – spinal stenosis
  – spondylarthritis
  – spondylarthropathies
  – arthritis, psoriatic
  – reactive arthritis
  – spondylitis, ankylosing
  – spondylitis
  – discitis
  – spondylitis, ankylosing
  – tuberculosis, spinal
  – spondylolisthesis
  – spondylolysis

– cartilage diseases

– chondromalacia patellae

– osteochondritis

– polychondritis, relapsing

– Tietze syndrome

– fasciitis

– fasciitis, necrotizing

– fasciitis, plantar

– foot deformities

– flatfoot

– foot deformities, acquired
  – bunion, tailor's
  – equinus deformity
  – hallux limitus
  – hallux rigidus

– foot deformities, congenital
  – clubfoot

– hallux valgus

– hallux varus

– hammer toe syndrome

– foot diseases

– fasciitis, plantar

– heel spur

– metatarsalgia

– posterior tibial tendon dysfunction

– hand deformities

– hand deformities, acquired

– hand deformities, congenital

– jaw diseases

– cherubism

– granuloma, giant cell

– jaw abnormalities
  – cleft palate
  – micrognathism
  – Pierre Robin syndrome
  – prognathism
  – retrognathism

– jaw cysts
  – nonodontogenic cysts
  – odontogenic cysts
  – basal cell nevus syndrome
  – dentigerous cyst
  – odontogenic cyst, calcifying
  – periodontal cyst
  – radicular cyst

– jaw, edentulous
  – jaw, edentulous, partially

– jaw neoplasms
  – mandibular neoplasms
  – maxillary neoplasms
  – palatal neoplasms

– mandibular diseases
  – craniomandibular disorders
  – temporomandibular joint disorders
  – temporomandibular joint dysfunction syndrome
  – mandibular neoplasms
  – prognathism
  – retrognathism

– maxillary diseases
  – maxillary neoplasms

– joint diseases

– ankylosis
  – spondylitis, ankylosing

– arthralgia
  – shoulder pain

– arthritis
  – arthritis, experimental
  – arthritis, infectious
  – arthritis, reactive
  – arthritis, psoriatic
  – arthritis, rheumatoid
  – arthritis, juvenile rheumatoid
  – Caplan's syndrome
  – Felty's syndrome
  – rheumatoid nodule
  – Sjögren syndrome
  – spondylitis, ankylosing
  – Still's disease, adult-onset
  – chondrocalcinosis
  – gout
  – arthritis, gouty
  – osteoarthritis
  – osteoarthritis, hip
  – osteoarthritis, knee
  – spinal osteophytosis
  – periarthritis
  – reactive arthritis
  – rheumatic fever
  – rheumatic nodule
  – Wissler's syndrome
  – spondylarthritis
  – spondylarthropathies
  – arthritis, psoriatic
  – arthritis, reactive
  – Reiter disease
  – spondylitis, ankylosing

– arthrogryposis

– arthropathy, neurogenic

– bursitis
  – periarthritis

– chondromatosis, synovial

– contracture
  – hip contracture

– hallux limitus

– hallux rigidus

– hemarthrosis

– hip dislocation, congenital

– hydrarthrosis

– joint deformities, acquired

– joint instability

– joint loose bodies

– metatarsalgia

– nail-patella syndrome

– osteoarthropathy, primary hypertrophic

– osteoarthropathy, secondary hypertrophic

– patellofemoral pain syndrome

– shoulder impingement syndrome

– synovitis
  – synovitis, pigmented villonodular

– temporomandibular joint disorders
  – temporomandibular joint dysfunction syndrome

– muscular diseases

– arthrogryposis

– compartment syndromes
  – anterior compartment syndrome

– contracture
  – Dupuytren's contracture
  – hip contracture

– craniomandibular disorders
  – temporomandibular joint disorders
  – temporomandibular joint dysfunction syndrome

– eosinophilia-myalgia syndrome

– fatigue syndrome, chronic

– fibromyalgia

– Isaacs syndrome

– mitochondrial myopathies
  – mitochondrial encephalomyopathies
  – MELAS syndrome
  – MERRF syndrome
  – ophthalmoplegia, chronic progressive external
  – Kearns–Sayre syndrome

– muscle cramp

– muscle neoplasms

– muscle rigidity

– muscle spasticity

– muscle weakness

– muscular disorders, atrophic
  – muscular dystrophies
  – distal myopathies
  – glycogen storage disease type vii
  – muscular dystrophies, limb-girdle
  – muscular dystrophy, duchenne
  – muscular dystrophy, emery-dreifuss
  – muscular dystrophy, facioscapulohumeral
  – muscular dystrophy, oculopharyngeal
  – myotonic dystrophy
  – postpoliomyelitis syndrome

– myofascial pain syndromes
  – temporomandibular joint dysfunction syndrome

– myopathies, structural, congenital
  – myopathies, nemaline
  – myopathy, central core

– myositis
  – dermatomyositis
  – myositis, inclusion body
  – myositis ossificans
  – polymyositis
  – dermatomyositis

– myotonic disorders
  – myotonia congenita
  – myotonic dystrophy

– paralyses, familial periodic
  – hypokalemic periodic paralysis
  – paralysis, hyperkalemic periodic

– polymyalgia rheumatica

– rhabdomyolysis
  – myoglobinuria

– tendinopathy
  – tenosynovitis

– musculoskeletal abnormalities

– arthrogryposis

– craniofacial abnormalities
  – cleidocranial dysplasia
  – craniofacial dysostosis
  – Hallermann's syndrome
  – hypertelorism
  – mandibulofacial dysostosis
  – Goldenhar syndrome
  – craniosynostoses
  – acrocephalosyndactylia
  – holoprosencephaly
  – leopard syndrome
  – maxillofacial abnormalities
  – jaw abnormalities
  – cleft palate
  – micrognathism
  – Pierre Robin syndrome
  – prognathism
  – retrognathism
  – microcephaly
  – Noonan syndrome
  – orofaciodigital syndromes
  – plagiocephaly, nonsynostotic
  – platybasia
  – Rubinstein–Taybi syndrome

– funnel chest

– gastroschisis

– hip dislocation, congenital

– Klippel–Feil syndrome

– limb deformities, congenital
  – ectromelia
  – lower extremity deformities, congenital
  – foot deformities, congenital
  – polydactyly
  – short rib-polydactyly syndrome
  – proteus syndrome
  – syndactyly
  – acrocephalosyndactylia
  – poland syndrome
  – thanatophoric dysplasia
  – upper extremity deformities, congenital
  – hand deformities, congenital

– synostosis
  – craniosynostoses
  – acrocephalosyndactylia
  – syndactyly
  – acrocephalosyndactylia
  – poland syndrome

– rheumatic diseases

– arthritis, rheumatoid
  – arthritis, juvenile rheumatoid
  – Caplan's syndrome
  – Felty's syndrome
  – rheumatoid nodule
  – Sjögren syndrome
  – spondylitis, ankylosing
  – Still's disease, adult-onset

– fibromyalgia

– gout
  – arthritis, gouty

– hyperostosis, sternocostoclavicular

– osteoarthritis
  – osteoarthritis, hip
  – osteoarthritis, knee
  – spinal osteophytosis

– polymyalgia rheumatica

– rheumatic fever
  – rheumatic nodule
  – Wissler's syndrome

– tennis elbow

The list continues at List of MeSH codes (C06).

C05